Ma'ale Gamla is an Israeli settlement and moshav located in the west part of the Golan Heights, under the administration of Israel. It falls under the municipal jurisdiction of Golan Regional Council.

The international community considers Israeli settlements in the Golan Heights illegal under international law, but the United States and the Israeli government dispute this.

History
The moshav was built in 1975 and was named after the ancient town of Gamla, destroyed in the course of the Jewish–Roman war in the 1st century CE, and believed to be the nearby ruin of Tell es Salam.

See also
Israeli-occupied territories

References

External links
Village website

Israeli settlements in the Golan Heights
Golan Regional Council
Moshavim
Populated places in Northern District (Israel)
Populated places established in 1975
1975 establishments in the Israeli Military Governorate